Jama Michalika is a popular café with history spanning over a hundred years. It is located at Floriańska Street in Kraków, the capital of the Lesser Poland region.

Jama Michalika (lit. Michalik's Den in Polish) is one of the oldest Kraków cafes. It was inaugurated in 1895 by Jan Apolinary Michalik, then under the name Cukiernia Lwowska (Lwów Confiserie). The current name, also translated as the Michalik's Cave, came into existence because initially Michalik could afford only a single room in the back, without any windows. The central location in the Ulica Floriańska 45 as well as the patisserie offering and the invitation to students from the nearby Academy of Fine Arts to eat there free of charge in exchange for their small works of art, the cafe became quickly popular.

In 1905 the cabaret Zielony Balonik (Green Balloon) started to perform here. As a highlight of every cabaret evening was the appearance of a puppet theatre designed and produced for widely popular shows against bigotry and imperial censorship, by Bronisława Janowska among others. Some of the dolls depicted prominent Cracovians. A selection of those historic puppets are displayed at the cafe. The interior is decorated with Art Nouveau furniture, mirrors, stained glass, lamps and cabinets.

See also 
 Antoni Hawełka
 Café Noworolski
 Wierzynek

References

External links 

 Homepage of Jama Michalika
 Jama Michalika Cafe on krakow-info.com

Tourist attractions in Kraków
Coffeehouses and cafés in Poland
1895 establishments in Austria-Hungary
Art Nouveau architecture in Poland
Art Nouveau restaurants
Restaurants established in 1895